Changpuek [English: White Elephant] Kiatsongrit (born October 13, 1966) is a Thai former Muay Thai fighter.  He is credited as being one of the first Muay Thai fighters to go abroad and fight other fighters of other martial arts styles, often stronger and heavier than himself, bringing to the world an understanding of the effectiveness of Muay Thai.  Changpuek is a seven time world champion who has fought some of the world's best fighters at middleweight to heavyweight and has wins against world class fighters such as Rob Kaman (x3), Rick Roufus, Peter Smit and Tosca Petridis. After ending his career as a professional fighter while working for Sitpholek gym in Pattaya, Thailand, he continued his employment at that gym as a Muay Thai trainer.

Biography and career
Changpuek was born and raised in a small village some 30 km from the town of Prakhonchai, Buriram in northeastern Thailand, one of seven children.  A young Changpuek became attracted to Muay Thai from watching local fighters and started training at home alongside his brothers under the tutelage of their father.  He had his first fight at 14 and by 18 had left home to join the Kiatsongrit Gym in Bangkok, where he would remain for more than sixteen years.  Changpuek fought at the lower weights in his early years spent on the Bangkok circuit, weighing as little as 49 kg (108 lbs) on his Rajadamnern Stadium debut.

After fighting for a number of years in Thailand, Changpuek found it increasingly difficult to get fights domestically as his weight (70 kg) was not typical for a Thai where competitive bouts at tend to be at the lower weights.  As a result, he started to fight abroad facing the K.I.C.K. world champion Rick Roufus in a non-title fight in Las Vegas in 1988.  Changpuek's leg kicks proved too much for Roufus, despite being knocked down in the first and suffering a broken jaw, won via knockout in the fifth round. The knockout was due to a culmination of low kicks that the American fighter was unprepared for.  In 1989 Changpuek faced another top class fighter in Rob Kaman.  Changpuek won the first match of four between the two by decision in Paris setting the way for a rematch in Amsterdam the following year this time with the added bonus of the I.M.T.F. light heavyweight world title.  Kaman gained his revenge in Amsterdam knocking out Changpuek in the last round of their match.  The third match between the pair followed two months later with Changpuek taking a decision victory and the belt which Kaman had only just won.

After his trilogy of fights with Kaman, Changpuek would continue to fight some of the top light heavyweight fighters in the world between 1990 and 1992, losing one and winning one against Peter Smit, defeating Luc Verheye by knockout and decisioning Orlando Wiet.  In this period he would lose and regain his I.M.T.F. world title and claim the first ever W.M.K. world belt.  In 1993 Changpuek was invited to compete against some of the world's top heavyweight kickboxers at the inaugural K-1 world grand prix, losing to eventual winner Branko Cikatić by knockout at the quarter final stage.  He was invited back by the organization to take part in a world title fight - defeating Taiei Kin over five rounds to claim the vacant U.K.F. belt.

1993 would continue to be a busy year for Changpuek, he fought on cards throughout the year in Japan picking up several victories as well as losing to legendary karateka Andy Hug at the karate world cup.  At the end of the year he fought in the K-2 Grand Prix '93 a tournament held by K-1 for light heavyweight fighters.  As the smallest fighter at the event weighing only 75 kg, Changpuek faced Rob Kaman in the fourth (and final) match of their quartet of fights, winning a grueling match by decision.  A victory in the semi finals against Tasis Petridis meant a final match against future four-time K-1 world champion Ernesto Hoost.  Changpuek managed to push the much larger Hoost into an extra round only to lose eventually via a head kick knockout.

Although Changpuek would never again quite hit the peak of his success of the early nineties, he fought a number more times with the K-1 organization, the highlight being a victory against Nobuaki Kakuda to claim the W.M.T.C. cruiserweight world title and wins against the likes of Kakuda were tempered by defeats against Michael Thompson, Ivan Hippolyte and Manson Gibson.  Changpuek fought a number of fights in Europe around the turn of the millennium winning the W.K.U. world title in 2001 but found victories harder to come by as the toll of career of 300+ fights set in and he retired around 2006 at the age of 40.  He currently resides in Pattaya, Thailand where he is the father of two children and is a Muay Thai coach.  His nephew, Kongsak Sithboonmee, was named Thailand's top Muay Thai boxer in April 2011.

Titles

Muay Thai
Lumpinee Stadium
 1987 Lumpinee Stadium 140 lbs Champion

 World Muay Thai Council
 1996 W.M.T.C. Cruiserweight World Champion -86 kg

 International Muay Thai Federation
 1992 I.M.T.F. Light Heavyweight World Champion -79 kg (1st title defence)
 1990 I.M.T.F Light Heavyweight World Champion -79 kg (retained title after losing it the same year)
 1990 I.M.T.F Light Heavyweight World Champion -79 kg

 World Muaythai Kickboxing
 1991 W.M.K. Heavyweight World Champion

Kickboxing
 Kickboxing Superstar
 2003 Kickboxing Superstar WGP Qualifications Tournament Runner Up

 World Kickboxing Union
 2001 W.K.U. Cruiserweight World Champion

 K-1
 1993 K-2 Grand Prix Runner Up -79 kg

 Universal Kickboxing Federation
 1993-94 U.K.F. Light Heavyweight World Champion -79 kg (0 title defences)

Record

|-  bgcolor="#FFBBBB"
| 2010 || Loss ||align=left| Martin Sithpolek || Fairtex Stadium || Pattaya, Thailand ||  TKO || 2 || 
|-  bgcolor="#FFBBBB"
| 2006-12-27 || Loss ||align=left| Johan Gouaida || Sitpholek Muaythai Promotion || Pattaya, Thailand || KO (Punches) || 1 ||
|-
|-  bgcolor="#FFBBBB"
| 2006-11-25 || Loss ||align=left| Martin van Emmen || Only the Strongest || Ter Apel, Netherlands || KO || 1 ||
|-
|-  bgcolor="#CCFFCC"
| 2003-05-17 || Win ||align=left| Frédérique Bellonie || Kickboxing Superstar WGP Qualifications, Final || Milano, Italy || Decision (Unanimous) || 3 || 3:00
|-
! style=background:white colspan=9 |
|- 
|-  bgcolor="#CCFFCC"
| 2003-05-17 || Win ||align=left| Babis Papadoupolous  || Kickboxing Superstar WGP Qualifications, Semi finals || Milano, Italy || Decision (Split) || 3 || 3:00
|-
|-  bgcolor="#FFBBBB"
| 2002-11-24 || Loss ||align=left| Igor Ivosevic || || Fiume, Croatia || DQ (Kneeing Opponent) || 2 ||
|-
|-  bgcolor="#FFBBBB"
| 2001-12-14 || Loss ||align=left| Manson Gibson || W.C.K. @ Palms Casino Resort || Las Vegas, NV, USA || KO (Spinning Heel Kick) || 2 || 0:48
|-
! style=background:white colspan=9 |
|-
|-  bgcolor="#CCFFCC"
| 2001-11-03 || Win ||align=left| Martin van Emmen || Gala in Steenwijk || Steenwijk, Netherlands || KO (Right Hook) || 2 ||
|-
|-  bgcolor="#CCFFCC"
|-
! style=background:white colspan=9 |
|-
|-  bgcolor="#FFBBBB"
| 2001-03-03 || Loss ||align=left| Ashwin Balrak || WPKL Muay Thai Champions League IV || Rotterdam, Netherlands || KO (Right knee to the body) || 3 ||
|-
|-  bgcolor="#FFBBBB"
| 1999-07-11 || Loss ||align=left| Ryuji Murakami || The Kakidamishi 1 || Okinawa, Japan || Decision (Unanimous) || 5 || 3:00
|-
|-  bgcolor="#CCFFCC"
| 1998-10-25 || Win ||align=left| Ryuji Murakami || MA Kick "Kickboxing Champion Wars All Star Matches" || Tokyo, Japan || Decision (Unanimous) || 5 || 3:00
|-
|-  bgcolor="#FFBBBB"
| 1998-04-26 || Loss ||align=left| Manson Gibson || Shoot boxing "Shoot the Shooto XX" || Tokyo, Japan || Decision (Unanimous) || 3 || 3:00
|-
|-  bgcolor="#c5d2ea"
| 1997-07-13 || Draw ||align=left| Hassan Ettaki || Night of the Titans || Rabat, Morocco || Decision Draw || 5 || 3:00
|-  bgcolor="#CCFFCC"
| 1997-04-29 || Win ||align=left| Nobuaki Kakuda || K-1 Braves '97 || Fukuoka, Japan || Decision (Unanimous) || 5 || 3:00
|-
|-  bgcolor="#CCFFCC"
|-
! style=background:white colspan=9 |
|-
|-  bgcolor="#FFBBBB"
| 1997 || Loss ||align=left| Stéphane Nikiéma || Muaythai Gala in Paris || Paris, France || KO (Punches) || 3 ||
|-
|-  bgcolor="#CCFFCC"
| 1996-03-01 || Win ||align=left| Hiromitsu Kanehara || UWF International || Tokyo, Japan || Decision (Unanimous) || 5 || 3:00
|-
|-  bgcolor="#FFBBBB"
| 1995-10-08 || Loss ||align=left| Gurkan Ozcan || The Test of Courage || Australia ||  KO (Punches) || 1 || 1:58

|-  bgcolor="#FFBBBB"
| 1995-07-16 || Loss ||align=left| Ivan Hippolyte || K-3 Grand Prix '95 Quarter-final || Nagoya, Japan ||  KO || 2 || 0:20
|-
|-  bgcolor="#CCFFCC"
| 1995-03-25 || Win ||align=left| Takashi Sugiyama || K-1 K-League Opening Fight || Tokyo, Japan || Decision (Unanimous) || 5 || 3:00
|-
|-  bgcolor="#FFBBBB"
| 1994-09-18 || Loss ||align=left| Michael Thompson || K-1 Revenge || Yokohama, Japan || KO (Left Spinning Kick) || 3 || 0:02
|-
|-  bgcolor="#FFBBBB"
| 1994-03-04 || Loss ||align=left| Taiei Kin || K-1 Challenge || Tokyo, Japan || Decision (Unanimous) || 3 || 3:00
|-
! style=background:white colspan=9 |
|-
|-  bgcolor="#FFBBBB"
| 1993-12-19 || Loss ||align=left| Ernesto Hoost || K-2 Grand Prix '93 Final || Tokyo, Japan || TKO (Right High Kick) || 4 || 0:40
|-
! style=background:white colspan=9 |
|-
|-  bgcolor="#CCFFCC"
| 1993-12-19 || Win ||align=left| Tosca Petridis || K-2 Grand Prix '93 Semi-final || Tokyo, Japan || Decision (Unanimous) || 3 || 3:00
|-
|-  bgcolor="#CCFFCC"
| 1993-12-19 || Win ||align=left| Rob Kaman || K-2 Grand Prix '93 Quarter-final || Tokyo, Japan || Decision (Unanimous) || 3 || 3:00
|-
|-  bgcolor="#CCFFCC"
| 1993-12-05 || Win ||align=left| Stéphane Nikiéma || Thailand || Thailand || KO (Left Low Kick) || 4 ||
|-
|-  bgcolor="#FFBBBB"
| 1993-10-03 || Loss ||align=left| Andy Hug || K-1 Illusion 1993 Karate World Cup Quarter Final || Osaka, Japan || Decision (Unanimous) || 1 || 3:00
|-
|-  bgcolor="#CCFFCC"
| 1993-10-03 || Win ||align=left| Shin Ushikoshi || K-1 Illusion 1993 Karate World Cup 1st Round || Osaka, Japan || Decision (Unanimous) || 1 || 3:00
|-
|-  bgcolor="#CCFFCC"
| 1993-09-04 || Win ||align=left| Toshiyuki Atokawa || K-1 Illusion || Tokyo, Japan || Decision (Unanimous) || 5 || 3:00
|-
|-  bgcolor="#CCFFCC"
| 1993-06-25 || Win ||align=left| Taiei Kin || K-1 Sanctuary III || Osaka, Japan || Decision (Unanimous) || 5 || 3:00
|-
! style=background:white colspan=9 |
|-
|-  bgcolor="#FFBBBB"
| 1993-04-30 || Loss ||align=left| Branko Cikatic || K-1 Grand Prix '93 Quarter Final || Tokyo, Japan || KO (Right Straight) || 1 || 2:35
|-
|-  bgcolor="#FFBBBB"
| 1992 || Loss ||align=left| Wade Woodbury || Test of Courage || Australia || KO (Punches) || 1 || 2:37
|-
|-  bgcolor="#CCFFCC"
| 1992 || Win ||align=left| Orlando Wiet || || Olham, England, UK || Decision (Split) || 5 || 3:00
|-
! style=background:white colspan=9 |
|-
|-  bgcolor="#CCFFCC"
| 1992 || Win ||align=left| Stéphane Nikiéma || || Bangkok, Thailand || KO (Left Low Kick) || 4 ||
|-
|-  bgcolor="#CCFFCC"
| 1991-05-24 || Win ||align=left| Marlon Benjamin || Yamaki Gym the 6th anniversary memorial event || Tokyo, Japan || KO (Left Straight) || 2 || 2:18
|-
! style=background:white colspan=9 |
|-
|-  bgcolor="#CCFFCC"
| 1990-12-15 || Win ||align=left| Luc Verheye ||  || Tokyo, Japan || TKO (Knee strike) || 3 ||
|-
|-  bgcolor="#CCFFCC"
| 1990-11-27 || Win ||align=left| Peter Smit || Lumpinee Stadium || Bangkok, Thailand || Decision || 5 || 3:00
|-
! style=background:white colspan=9 |
|-
|-  bgcolor="#CCFFCC"
| 1990-09-28 || Win ||align=left| Glenn Brasdorp || A.J.K.F Inspiring Wars "Heat-928" || Tokyo, Japan || Decision (Unanimous) || 5 || 3:00
|-
|-  bgcolor="#FFBBBB"
| 1990-08-31 || Loss ||align=left| Peter Smit || Lumpinee Stadium || Bangkok, Thailand || KO (Punches) || 2 ||
|-
! style=background:white colspan=9 |
|-
|-  bgcolor="#CCFFCC"
| 1990-06-30 || Win ||align=left| Dale Cook || AJKF "Inspiring Wars Heat 630" || Tokyo, Japan || KO (Right Hook) || 2 || 1:28
|-
|-  bgcolor="#CCFFCC"
| 1990-05-18 || Win ||align=left| Hideo Suzuki || MA Nihon Kick || Tokyo, Japan || KO (Low Kicks) || 2 ||
|-  bgcolor="#CCFFCC"
| 1990-04-24 || Win ||align=left| Rob Kaman || Holland Goes to Thailand, Lumpinee Stadium || Bangkok, Thailand || Decision || 5 || 3:00
|-
! style=background:white colspan=9 |
|-
|-  bgcolor="#FFBBBB"
| 1990-02-18 || Loss ||align=left| Rob Kaman || Holland vs Thailand 1990 || Amsterdam, Netherlands || KO || 5 ||
|-
! style=background:white colspan=9 |
|-
|-  bgcolor="#CCFFCC"
| 1989-12-31 || Win ||align=left| Rob Kaman || || Paris, France || Decision || 5 || 3:00
|-
|-  bgcolor="#CCFFCC"
| 1988-11-05 || Win ||align=left| Rick Roufus || Sands Hotel & Casino || Las Vegas, Nevada, United States || KO (Left Low Kicks) || 5 || 1:23
|-
|-
|-  bgcolor="#CCFFCC"
| 1988- || Win ||align=left| Mongkoldej Kiatprasarnchai  ||  || Thailand || Decision || 5 || 3:00 
|-  bgcolor="#CCFFCC"
| 1988- || Win ||align=left| Payap Premchai || Lumpinee Stadium || Bangkok, Thailand || KO (Low kicks) || 1 || 
|-
|-  style="background:#fbb;"
| 1987-10-30 || Loss ||align=left| Krongsak Na Teerawong ||  || Bangkok, Thailand || KO || 3 ||

|-  style="background:#cfc;"
| 1987-04-24 || Win ||align=left| Payap Premchai || Rangsit Stadium || Pathum Thani, Thailand || DQ (threw a kick)|| 4 || 
|-
! style=background:white colspan=9 |

|-  style="background:#cfc;"
| 1987-03-20 || Win ||align=left| Raktae Muangsurin || Rangsit Stadium || Pathum Thani, Thailand || Decision || 5 || 3:00
|-
! style=background:white colspan=9 |

|-  style="background:#cfc;"
| 1987-03-06 || Win ||align=left| Krongsak Na Teerawong ||  || Ubon Ratchathani province, Thailand || Decision|| 5||3:00  

|-  style="background:#cfc;"
| ? || Win ||align=left| Samart Prasarnmit ||  || Thailand || Decision|| 5||3:00 

|-  style="background:#cfc;"
| 1986-10-31 || Win ||align=left| Punthai Pinsinchai || Rangsit Stadium || Pathum Thani, Thailand || Decision || 5 || 3:00

|-  style="background:#fbb;"
| 1986-08-08 || Loss ||align=left| Raktae Muangsurin || Rangsit Stadium || Pathum Thani, Thailand || KO (Right cross) || 3 ||

|-  style="background:#fbb;"
| 1982-12-08 || Loss ||align=left| Rungsiri Na Pattaya || Rajadamnern Stadium || Bangkok, Thailand || Decision|| 5||3:00  
|-
| colspan=9 | Legend:

Mixed rules 

| Draw
|align=center| 0–0–1
| Yoji Anjo
| Draw
| UWF U-Cosmos
| 
|align=center| 5
|align=center| 3:00
| Tokyo, Japan
| 
|-

References

External links
K-1 Sport.de profile

Living people
1966 births
Middleweight kickboxers
Light heavyweight kickboxers
Cruiserweight kickboxers
Heavyweight kickboxers
Changpuek Kiatsongrit
Changpuek Kiatsongrit